Rainer K. Silbereisen (born 24 August 1944) is a German psychologist who serves as Research Professor of Developmental Psychology at the University of Jena, where he is also Director of the Center for Applied Developmental Science. He is a fellow of the American Psychological Association and the Association for Psychological Science, as well as a member of Academia Europaea. He has served as president of the German Psychological Society, the International Society for the Study of Behavioural Development, and the International Union of Psychological Science. He has also served as editor-in-chief of the International Journal of Behavioral Development, European Psychologist, and the International Journal of Psychology.

References

External links

Entry in SAGE Social Science Thesaurus

1944 births
Living people
German psychologists
People from Freudenstadt
Academic staff of the Technical University of Berlin
Academic staff of the University of Jena
Academic journal editors
Fellows of the American Psychological Association
Fellows of the Association for Psychological Science
Members of Academia Europaea
Technical University of Berlin alumni